Norton, formerly known as Norton by Symantec, is a brand of Gen Digital (formerly NortonLifeLock) based in Tempe, Arizona. Since being acquired by the Symantec Corporation in 1990, Norton offers a variety of products and services related to digital security, identity protection, and online privacy. In 2014, Norton's parent company Symantec separated their business into two units. One was focused on security and the other was focused on information management; Norton was placed in the unit focused on security. The company originally provided utility software for DOS.

History
Peter Norton Computing, Inc. was a software company founded by Peter Norton. Norton and his company developed various DOS utilities including the Norton Utilities which did not include antivirus features.

In 1990, the company was acquired by Symantec and renamed Peter Norton Consulting Group. Symantec's consumer antivirus and data management utilities are still marketed under the Norton name.

In early 1991, Symantec's Norton Group launched Norton AntiVirus 1.0 for PC and compatible computers. The company updated and diversified its product line until finally combining its offerings into one seamless product, Norton Security.

Products and Services
Norton’s products are primarily digital security tools for personal computers, server devices and, more recently, mobile devices.

In the 1990s, Norton provided software to check computer systems for Y2K compliance.

The company's primary product is Norton Security. The software is licensed to individuals, small businesses and enterprises. It includes malware prevention and removal during the subscription period for up to five devices. Other features included in the product are a personal firewall, email spam filtering and phishing protection. The program was released in September 2014, replacing Norton 360, Norton Internet Security, and Norton AntiVirus. A mesh Wi-Fi network is developed by Norton, intended to protect computers inside the network from unsafe Web sites. A mobile version of the software is also available.

Norton also provides backup software to keep its user's files safe. 25GB of online storage is provided for backing up important photos and documents from a user's devices.

A cloud-based parental control service known as Norton Family Premier is developed by the company, formerly known as Norton Online Family. The software is aimed at "fostering communication" involving parents and their children's online activities.

Norton Computer Tune Up is a program that helps users increase the performance of older computer systems. The program uses inspection and repair services designed to restore speed and performance in place of a new computer or repair-shop work. Norton-certified technicians are available to offer repair assistance.

Norton Guides (1985)
Developed and distributed by Peter Norton Computing. The guides were written by Warren Woodford for the x86 Assembly Language, C, BASIC and Forth languages which were made available to users via a terminate-and-stay-resident program that integrated with programming language editors on IBM PC-type computers. This appears to be the first example of a commercial product where programming reference information was integrated into the software development environment.

Security considerations 
In January 2022, a several users brought to light an issue with a hidden backdoor crypto-mining tool in the Norton 360 security software suite. Following the report in media Norton highlighted the procedure for uninstalling the product from their computer.

Awards
 In 2012, Norton by Symantec won PC Advisor’s Best Security Software award, stating that “Norton is probably the best known of all internet security products, and Symantec has stood the test of time by constantly improving its product with useful extras, both in its core engine and in the way it reports what it’s been up to.”
 In 2015, Norton by Symantec won AV-TEST’s Innovation Award for Mobile Security, stating, “Prior to the download of an app, Norton Mobile Security for Android already knows all its potential risks. It is backed by a unique system consisting of the App Advisor for Google Play and Norton Mobile Insight.”
 In 2015, Norton Mobile Security and Norton Family Premier both received PC Magazine's Editors' Choice Awards.

See also
 Comparison of antivirus software
 Comparison of firewalls
 Gen Digital

References

External links

 
Gen Digital software
Content-control software
Antivirus software
Computer security software
Internet security